Immaculata Preparatory School was a private all-girls school that operated in the Washington, D.C. area from 1905 to 1991.

History

Immaculata Seminary was opened by the Sisters of Providence of Saint Mary-of-the-Woods in 1905 in the Tenleytown neighborhood of Washington, D.C.

After plans were made to close the school and sell the campus to American University in 1984, a group of parents successfully sued the Sisters of Providence in order to keep the school open. Immaculata then moved to Rockville, Maryland, where it operated as "Immaculata College High School" until 1991.

Notable alumnae
Maeve Brennan, '36
Maureen Dowd, '70
Regina Hall, '88
Patricia McGerr, '33

In popular culture
In his 1917 book, The Profits of Religion, Upton Sinclair mentions Immaculata Seminary among a list of Catholic schools and colleges with "strange titles."
During his 2018 confirmation hearings, Brett Kavanaugh described socializing with friends from Catholic all-girls high schools, including Immaculata.

References

External links

Girls' schools in the United States
Educational institutions established in 1905
1905 establishments in Washington, D.C.
Catholic secondary schools in Washington, D.C.
Girls' schools in Washington, D.C.